Puerto Rico Highway 174 (PR-174) is a road that travels from Bayamón, Puerto Rico to Aguas Buenas. This highway begins at PR-5 south of downtown Bayamón and ends at PR-156 in downtown Aguas Buenas.

Major intersections

See also

 List of highways numbered 174

References

External links
 

174